Dasht-e Shaqin (also Romanized as Dasht-e Shaqīn; also known as Dasht-e Shaghīn, Dasht-e Shaqī, Dasht-i-Shaghin, Dasht Sheqī, and Saghīn) is a village in Hoseynabad-e Goruh Rural District, Rayen District, Kerman County, Kerman Province, Iran. At the 2006 census, its population was 26, in 6 families.

References 

Populated places in Kerman County